The Sledgehammer Files: The Best of Soilwork 1998–2008 is the first compilation album by Swedish melodic death metal band Soilwork, released in 2010 on Avalon Marquee Records.

Track listing
 Sadistic Lullabye [remastered] - 2:55
 Steelbath Suicide [remastered] - 2:55
 The Chainheart Machine [remastered] - 4:02
 Bulletbeast [remastered] - 4:38
 Generation Speedkill [remastered] - 4:28
 Bastard Chain - 4:03
 Needlefeast  - 4:07
 Grand Failure Anthem - 5:21
 Follow the Hollow - 4:03
 As We Speak - 3:41
 Black Star Deceiver - 4:42
 Rejection Role - 3:35
 Figure Number Five - 3:10
 Light the Torch - 3:39
 Stabbing the Drama - 4:34
 One with the Flies - 4:01
 Nerve - 3:39
 Sworn to a Great Divide - 3:31
 Exile [Orchestral Mix] - 3:45

Personnel
'''Soilwork
Björn "Speed" Strid - vocals
Ola Flink - bass
Peter Wichers - guitars (tracks 1-17)
Daniel Antonsson - guitars (tracks 18-19)
Ludvig Svartz - guitars (tracks 1-2)
Ola Frenning - guitars (tracks 3-19)
Carlos Del Olmo Holmberg - keyboards (tracks 1-8)
Sven Karlsson - keyboards (tracks 9-19)
Jimmy Persson - drums (tracks 1-2)
Henry Ranta - drums (tracks 3-14)
Dirk Verbeuren - drums (tracks 15-19)

See also
List of "Greatest Hits" albums

References

2010 greatest hits albums
Soilwork albums